John William Embree (born July 13, 1944) is a former American football wide receiver. 

Embree was born in St. Louis in 1944. He played college football at Compton Community College in California.

He played professional in the National Football League (NFL) for the Denver Broncos. He appeared in 20 games for the Broncos, six as a starter, totaling 33 receptions for 519 yards and five touchdowns.

Embree's son, Jon Embree, also played in the NFL.
His grandson Taylor Embree coaches in the NFL.

References

1944 births
Living people
American football wide receivers
Denver Broncos players
Players of American football from St. Louis